Brookline Hills station is a light rail station on the Massachusetts Bay Transportation Authority (MBTA) Green Line D branch in the Brookline Hills neighborhood of Brookline, Massachusetts. The station has two side platforms serving the line's two tracks. It was closed from April 2021 to January 2022 as part of adjacent construction on a Brookline High School building, which included renovations to make the station accessible.

History

The Brookline Branch of the Boston and Worcester Railroad was extended west to Newton Upper Falls by the Charles River Branch Railroad in November 1852. Cypress Street station – later Brookline Hills – was added after 1858.

After 1886, loop service was run on the Highland branch via what is now the Framingham/Worcester Line, and later via the Needham Line. In March 1892, a new station designed by Shepley, Rutan and Coolidge was opened.

The station agent was removed in May 1949, but the station building remained in use as shelter for passengers. The final trains on the line ran on May 31, 1958. The line was converted to light rail by the M.T.A. and Brookline Hills reopened on July 4, 1959, along with the rest of the D branch. The 1892 depot is no longer extant.

Accessibility

In the early 2000s, the MBTA modified key surface stops with raised platforms for accessibility. Brookline Hills was not among those initially outfitted with portable lifts, nor was it retrofitted with raised platforms. However, portable lifts were installed by 2003. 

Around 2006, the MBTA added wooden mini-high platforms on both platforms, allowing level boarding on older Type 7 LRVs. These platforms were installed at eight Green Line stations in 2006–07 as part of the settlement of Joanne Daniels-Finegold, et al. v. MBTA.

The station was renovated with fully accessible platforms as part of an expansion of Brookline High School, which included a new school building partially over the eastern end of the platforms. Construction began in late 2019; the station closed on April 12, 2021 for the final phase. The renovated station opened on January 8, 2022.

References

External links

MBTA - Brookline Hills
Station from Google Maps Street View

1959 establishments in Massachusetts
Green Line (MBTA) stations
Railway stations in Brookline, Massachusetts
Railway stations in the United States opened in 1959
Former Boston and Albany Railroad stations
Railway stations closed in 1958